Fastnet can refer to:
Fastnet International Schools Regatta, a regatta held in County Cork, Ireland
Fastnet Line, a passenger ferry service operating between Wales and Ireland
Fastnet (netball), a variation of the rules of netball used primarily in the World Netball Series
Fastnet Race, one of the four or so most prestigious ocean races in competitive sailing
Fastnet Rock,  a small clay-slate island with quartz veins and the most southerly point of Ireland
A sea area, named for the rock, used in the British Shipping Forecast
Fastnet Rock (horse), an Australian thoroughbred racehorse stallion
FastNet, the business name of South African communication service provider Swiftnet Pty Ltd, a  subsidiary of Telkom